Salim Moizini (born 17 October 1985) is a former professional footballer who played as a midfielder. Born in France, he made one appearance for the Comoros national team.

He joined Lyon La-Duchère in November 2015. He previously played for CA Bastia in Ligue 2.

External links
 

1985 births
Living people
French sportspeople of Comorian descent
French footballers
Comorian footballers
Footballers from Marseille
Association football midfielders
Comoros international footballers
Ligue 2 players
Championnat National players
Championnat National 2 players
SC Bastia players
Paris FC players
CA Bastia players
AS Saint-Priest players
ASM Vénissieux players
Lyon La Duchère players